Mo Thugs III: The Mothership is the third studio album by American hip hop collective Mo Thugs. It was released on June 13, 2000 via Koch Records. Production was handled by Thin C., Rich E., Mike Smoov, Darren Vegas, Damon Elliott, and Layzie Bone, who also served as executive producer. The album peaked at number 45 on the Billboard 200, number 13 on the Top R&B/Hip-Hop Albums and number 2 on the Independent Albums in the United States.

This album saw the departure of many Mo Thug artists including Souljah Boy, Graveyard Shift, Poetic Hustla'z, II Tru, MT5, & Powder. Krayzie Bone, who was one of the founding members of the Mo Thugs record label, also did not participate on this project. Most fans consider this album a disappointment compared to previous Mo Thugs albums due to the massive change of artists signed to the label. The album spawned a single, "This Ain't Livin'" by Layzie Bone and featured Felecia, which was a minor success.

Track listing

Charts

References

External links

2000 albums
Sequel albums
Mo Thugs albums
E1 Music albums